İbrahim Toraman (born 20 November 1981) is a Turkish former professional footballer. He played as a defender in centre, right back or occasionally in defensive midfield positions.

Career
Toraman's career started with local club Sivas DSİ Spor, playing six years at the amateur level. He was named second-best player out of all amateur level teams in Turkey. Professionally, Toraman played for Gaziantepspor and attracted attention with his success. In his last two years at Gaziantepspor, he was reportedly added to the top of many teams' transfer lists. Toraman, was signed by Istanbul club Beşiktaş J.K. in the 2004–05 pre-season on a three-year contract with a transfer fee of $2.5 million.

Following the incident with Beşiktaş teammate Sezer Öztürk Toraman was left out of the Beşiktaş squad under Slaven Bilić's management at the start of the 2013–14 season.

Before the beginning of the 2014–15 season, he was loaned to Sivasspor.

Career statistics
Score and result list Turkey's goal tally first, score column indicates score after Toraman goal.

Honours
Turkey
 FIFA Confederations Cup: third place 2003

Beşiktaş
 Süper Lig: 2008–09
 Turkish Cup: 2005–06, 2006–07, 2008–09, 2010–11
 Turkish Super Cup: 2006

References

External links
 
 
 
 
 
 Guardian Stats Centre

1981 births
Living people
People from Sivas
Turkish footballers
Association football central defenders
Turkey international footballers
Turkey under-21 international footballers
2003 FIFA Confederations Cup players
Süper Lig players
Gaziantepspor footballers
Beşiktaş J.K. footballers
Sivasspor footballers